The ABA League Player of the Month Award is a basketball award that recognizes the best ABA League player for each month of the season.

Winners

Awards won by player's nationality

Awards won by club

See also
ABA League MVP
ABA League Finals MVP
ABA League Top Scorer
ABA League Top Prospect
ABA League Ideal Starting Five

References

External links
 Adriatic ABA League official website
 Adriatic ABA League page at Eurobasket.com

Player of the Month